The XXI Corps was a corps of the U.S. Army during World War II.  It was constituted on 2 December 1943, and activated on 6 December 1943 at Camp Polk, Louisiana. XXI Corps fought for 116 days in the European Theater of Operations, starting in the Alsace, crossing into southern Germany, and swarming into Austria, with individual elements reaching into northern Italy. The corps was commanded in combat by Major General Frank W. Milburn as a subordinate unit of the Seventh U.S. Army.

Eastern France
The corps commenced combat operations 17 January 1945, during pitched battle by the U.S. Seventh Army to regain ground lost to Germany's Operation Nordwind New Year's offensive into Alsace. From 25 January until 16 February 1945, XXI Corps was attached to the French First Army and took part in bitter winter combat that ultimately collapsed the Colmar Pocket. After a period of rest, the corps returned to the front on 28 February 1945 and pushed to the edge of the Siegfried Line during the first week of March, 1945.

Germany and Austria

On 20 March 1945, after five days of combat, the corps broke through the Siegfried Line and captured Saarbrücken. Crossing the Rhine behind the U.S. XV Corps in Operation Undertone, the XXI Corps captured Würzburg on 5 April 1945, after a three-day battle marked by an assault across the Main River. Facing determined opposition, the corps fought its way into Schweinfurt on 12 April 1945, after five days of battle. Assaulting Fuerth on 18 April 1945, the corps seized Ansbach the following day and began a drive on the Danube River, over which the corps seized an intact bridge at Dillingen on 22 April 1945. On 28 April 1945, Augsburg fell to the XXI Corps, and on 1 May 1945, the corps seized Bad Tölz and captured German Field Marshal Gerd von Rundstedt. On 3 May 1945, units of the corps that included the 12th Armored Division entered Austria via Kufstein, and advanced along the Inn River as far as Wörgl until met the next day by troops of the 409th Infantry Regiment of the Fifth Army's 103rd Infantry Division of VI Corps radiating northeast from Innsbruck.</ref> German forces in the area unconditionally surrendered on 6 May 1945.

Other XXI Corps elements, which included the attached 101st Airborne Division, reached Berchtesgaden from the northwest by 8 May.

XXI Corps Headquarters was inactivated in Germany on 30 September 1945.

Post WWII
Subsequent to the Second World War, the corps was active from September 1957 until June 1970. The post-Second World War activation and inactivation occurred at Indiantown Gap Military Reservation, Pennsylvania.

Campaign credit
 Ardennes-Alsace Battle Credit
 Rhineland
 Central Europe

See also
 Sixth United States Army Group
 Seventh United States Army
 12th Armored Division (United States)
 101st Cavalry Regiment
 289th Engineer Combat Battalion (United States)
 549th Engineer Light Ponton Company

References 
 Williams, Mary H., compiler (1958).  "U.S. Army in World War II, Chronology 1941–1945". Washington D.C.: Government Printing Office.
 Wilson, John B., compiler (1999).  "Armies, Corps, Divisions, and Separate Brigades". Washington D.C.: Government Printing Office. .

21
21
Military units and formations established in 1943
Military units and formations disestablished in 1945